The 2007 Futsal Mundialito was an international friendly championship in futsal. The tournament was held in Algarve, Portugal from 4 to 8 of July 2007. The championship was played in Praia da Alagoa.

Tournament

1st round

Group A

Standing

Matches

Group B

Standing

Matches

Knockout stage

5th & 6th Places

Honors 

Best Player: Arnaldo Pereira - 
Best Goalkeeper: João Benedito - 
Top Goal Scorer: Tamas Lódi -  (8)
Fair-Play Team:

Sources 
Futsal Planet

Futsal Mundialito
International futsal competitions hosted by Portugal
Futsal Mundialito, 2007
2007–08 in Portuguese football
2007–08 in Slovak football
2007–08 in Croatian football
2007–08 in Hungarian football
2007 in Angolan football
2007 in African football